Alpinia is a genus of flowering plants in the ginger family, Zingiberaceae. It is named for Prospero Alpini, a 17th-century Italian botanist who specialized in exotic plants. Species are native to Asia, Australia, and the Pacific Islands, where they occur in tropical and subtropical climates. Several species are cultivated as ornamental plants. Species of the genus are known generally as shell ginger.

Description 
A few species have been known to reach . They grow from thick rhizomes. The leaves are lance-shaped to oblong. The inflorescence takes the form of a spike, a panicle, or a raceme. It may be hooded in bracts and bracteoles. The flower has a shallowly toothed calyx which is sometimes split on one side. The flower corolla is a cylindrical tube with three lobes at the mouth, the middle lobe larger and hoodlike in some taxa. There is one fertile stamen and two staminodes, which are often joined into a petal-like labellum, a structure that is inconspicuous in some species and quite showy in others. The fruit is a rounded, dry or fleshy capsule. The plants are generally aromatic due to their essential oils.

Ecology 
Most Alpinia are plants of forest understory habitat. Most are pollinated by large bees, but some are pollinated by birds and bats.

Uses 
According to the research on Alpinia by the research team of National Chung Hsing University, "Alpinia has anti-inflammatory, hypolipidemic, anti-tumor and other effects."

Species 
This is the largest genus in the ginger family, with about 230 species. A number of those are commonly grown for their flowers, and others are used as spices.  Species include:

Alpinia abundiflora
Alpinia acrostachya
Alpinia acuminata
Alpinia aenea
Alpinia affinis
Alpinia agiokuensis
Alpinia alata
Alpinia albertisii
Alpinia albipurpurea
Alpinia allugas
Alpinia amentacea
Alpinia angustifolia
Alpinia annabellae
Alpinia antillarum
Alpinia apoensis
Alpinia aquatica
Alpinia arctiflora
Alpinia arfakensis
Alpinia arundelliana
Alpinia assimilis
Alpinia athroantha
Alpinia aurantiaca
Alpinia auriculata
Alpinia bambusifolia
Alpinia beamanii
Alpinia biakensis
Alpinia bicalyculata
Alpinia bifida
Alpinia bilamellata
Alpinia bisculata
Alpinia blepharocalyx
Alpinia blumei
Alpinia boia
Alpinia boninsimensis
Alpinia borneensis
Alpinia borraginoides
Alpinia brachyantha
Alpinia brachypoda
Alpinia bracteata
Alpinia breviligulata (Gagnep.)
Alpinia brevilabris
Alpinia brevis
Alpinia brevituba
Alpinia burkillii
Alpinia caerulea – Australian native ginger
Alpinia calcarata – heen araththa, cardamom ginger 
Alpinia calcicola
Alpinia calycodes
Alpinia campanaria
Alpinia cannaefolium
Alpinia capitellata
Alpinia cardamomum-medium
Alpinia carinata
Alpinia carnea
Alpinia carolinensis
Alpinia celebica
Alpinia cernua
Alpinia chaunocolea
Alpinia chinensis
Alpinia chrysorachis
Alpinia coeruleoviridis
Alpinia colossea
Alpinia comosa
Alpinia conchigera – lesser alpinia
Alpinia condensata
Alpinia conferta
Alpinia congesta
Alpinia conghuaensis
Alpinia conglomerata
Alpinia copelandii
Alpinia corallina
Alpinia coriacea
Alpinia coriandriodora
Alpinia cornu-cervi
Alpinia cristata
Alpinia crocodocalyx
Alpinia cumingii
Alpinia cylindrocephala
Alpinia dasystachys
Alpinia decurva
Alpinia decurvata
Alpinia dekockii
Alpinia densespictata
Alpinia densibractetata
Alpinia densiflora
Alpinia diffissa
Alpinia divaricata
Alpinia dolichocephala
Alpinia domatifera
Alpinia dyeri
Alpinia edanoi
Alpinia elmeri
Alpinia elwesii
Alpinia emaculata
Alpinia engleriana
Alpinia eremochlamys
Alpinia eremochlamys
Alpinia euastra
Alpinia eubractea
Alpinia eustales
Alpinia exostylis
Alpinia flabellata
Alpinia flava
Alpinia flexistamen
Alpinia fluvitialis
Alpinia formosana
Alpinia foxworthyi
Alpinia fraseriana
Alpinia fusiformis
Alpinia gagnepainii
Alpinia galanga – greater galangal
Alpinia gigantea
Alpinia glabra
Alpinia glabrescens
Alpinia glacicaerulea
Alpinia globosa – round Chinese cardamom
Alpinia gracilis
Alpinia gracillima
Alpinia graminea
Alpinia grandiceps
Alpinia grandis
Alpinia guinanensis
Alpinia haenkei
Alpinia hagena
Alpinia hainanensis
Alpinia hamiltoniana
Alpinia hansenii
Alpinia havilandii
Alpinia hemsleyanan
Alpinia henryi
Alpinia hibinoi
Alpinia himantoglossa
Alpinia hirsuta
Alpinia hokutensis
Alpinia homeana
Alpinia hookeriana
Alpinia hulstijnii
Alpinia humilis
Alpinia hylandii
Alpinia illustris
Alpinia intermedia
Alpinia involucrata
Alpinia iriomotensis
Alpinia janowskii
Alpinia japonica
Alpinia javanica – Javanese alpinia
Alpinia jianganfeng
Alpinia jingxiensis
Alpinia kainantensis
Alpinia katsumadae
Alpinia kelungensis
Alpinia kermesina
Alpinia kiungensis
Alpinia kiushiana
Alpinia koidzumiana
Alpinia korthalsii
Alpinia koshunensis
Alpinia kumatahe
Alpinia kusshakuensis
Alpinia kwangsiensis
Alpinia laosensis
Alpinia latilabris
Alpinia lauterbachii
Alpinia laxiflora
Alpinia laxisecunda
Alpinia leptostachya
Alpinia ligulata
Alpinia linguiformis
Alpinia longepetiola
Alpinia luteo-carpa
Alpinia maclurei
Alpinia macrantha
Alpinia macrocarpa
Alpinia macrocephala
Alpinia macroscaphis
Alpinia macrostemon
Alpinia macroura
Alpinia maculata
Alpinia malaccensis – rathkihiriya
Alpinia manii
Alpinia manostachys
Alpinia martinii
Alpinia maxii
Alpinia mediomaculata
Alpinia melanocarpa – black-fruited alpinia
Alpinia menghaiensis
Alpinia mesanthera
Alpinia microlophon
Alpinia missionis
Alpinia modesta
Alpinia mollis
Alpinia mollissima
Alpinia molucana
Alpinia monopleura
Alpinia multispicata
Alpinia murdochii
Alpinia musaefedia
Alpinia mutica – small shell ginger, orchid ginger, narrow-leaved alpinia
Alpinia myriocratera
Alpinia nanchuanensis
Alpinia napoensis
Alpinia neesana
Alpinia nidus-vespae
Alpinia nieuwenhuizii
Alpinia nigra
Alpinia novae-hiberniae
Alpinia novae-pommeraniae
Alpinia nupiocratera
Alpinia nutans – dwarf cardamom, ginger lily, shell ginger
Alpinia oblongifolia
Alpinia oceanica
Alpinia odontonema
Alpinia officinarum – lesser galangal, Chinese ginger
Alpinia oligantha
Alpinia orchioides
Alpinia orthostachys
Alpinia ovata
Alpinia ovoidocarpa
Alpinia oxymitra
Alpinia oxyphylla – sharp-leaf galangal
Alpinia padacanca
Alpinia pahangensis
Alpinia papuana
Alpinia parviflora
Alpinia pectinata
Alpinia penduliflora
Alpinia penicillata
Alpinia petiolata – stalked-leaved alpinia
Alpinia philippinensis
Alpinia phoenicea
Alpinia pininga
Alpinia pinnanensis
Alpinia platychilus
Alpinia plectophylla
Alpinia plumieri
Alpinia polyantha
Alpinia porphyrea
Alpinia porphyrocarpa
Alpinia porrecta
Alpinia pricei
Alpinia psilogyna
Alpinia pterocalyx
Alpinia ptychanthera
Alpinia pulcherrima
Alpinia pumila
Alpinia punicea
Alpinia purpurata – red ginger
Alpinia pyramidata – Java galangal
Alpinia quadriloba
Alpinia racimigera
Alpinia racemosa
Alpinia rafflesiana – Raffles' alpinia
Alpinia rechingeri
Alpinia regia
Alpinia reticosa
Alpinia rheedii
Alpinia rigida
Alpinia rolfei
Alpinia romblonensis
Alpinia romburghiana
Alpinia rosacea
Alpinia roscoeana
Alpinia rosea
Alpinia rosella
Alpinia roxburghii
Alpinia rubella
Alpinia rubra
Alpinia rubricaulis
Alpinia rubromaculata
Alpinia salamonensis
Alpinia samoensis
Alpinia sanderae
Alpinia sandsii
Alpinia sasakii
Alpinia satsumensis
Alpinia schultzei
Alpinia schumanniana
Alpinia secunda
Alpinia secundiflora
Alpinia seimundii
Alpinia sericea
Alpinia sericiflora
Alpinia serrulata
Alpinia shimadae
Alpinia siamensis
Alpinia sibuyanensis
Alpinia silvicola
Alpinia simsii
Alpinia singuliflora
Alpinia smithiae
Alpinia spicata
Alpinia squarrosa
Alpinia stachyodes
Alpinia stapfiana
Alpinia stenobracteolata
Alpinia stenostachys
Alpinia striata
Alpinia strobilacea
Alpinia strobiliformis
Alpinia subfusicarpa
Alpinia submutica
Alpinia subspicata
Alpinia subverticillata
Alpinia suishaensis
Alpinia takaminei
Alpinia tamacuensis
Alpinia tomentosa
Alpinia tonkinensis
Alpinia tonrokuensis
Alpinia trachyascus
Alpinia tricolor
Alpinia tubulata
Alpinia unilateralis
Alpinia uraiensis
Alpinia uviformis
Alpinia valetoniana
Alpinia vanoverberghii
Alpinia velutina
Alpinia versicolor
Alpinia viridiflora
Alpinia vittata – variegate-ginger
Alpinia vitiensis
Alpinia vulcanica
Alpinia walang
Alpinia warburgii
Alpinia wenzelii
Alpinia werneri
Alpinia womerslyi
Alpinia wrayi
Alpinia zerumbet – shell ginger (synonym Alpinia speciosa)
Alpinia zingiberina

Gallery

See also

 alpinetin
 List of plants known as lily

References 

 
Zingiberaceae genera